The Uzbekistan women's national basketball team is the women's national basketball team of Uzbekistan. It is administered by the Basketball Federation of Uzbekistan.

Current roster
Roster for the 2017 FIBA Women's Asia Cup.

See also
Uzbekistan women's national under-19 basketball team
Uzbekistan women's national under-17 basketball team
Uzbekistan women's national 3x3 team

References

External links
Official website
FIBA profile
Uzbekistan Basketball Records at FIBA Archive
Uzbekistani Women National Team 2016 at Asia-basket.com

Women's national basketball teams
Basketball in Uzbekistan
Basketball teams in Uzbekistan
Women's national sports teams of Uzbekistan